The 2016 Milwaukee Brewers season was the 47th season for the Brewers in Milwaukee, the 19th in the National League, and 48th overall. They finished the season in fourth place in the National League Central Division and did not make the playoffs.

Regular season

Season standings

National League Central

National League Wild Card

Record vs. opponents

Game log

! width="5%"  | Streak
|- bgcolor="#ffbbbb"
| 1 || April 4 || Giants || 3–12 || Bumgarner (1–0) || Peralta (0–1) || — || 44,318 || 0–1 || L1
|- bgcolor="#ffbbbb"
| 2 || April 5 || Giants || 1–2 || Cueto (1–0) || Nelson (0–1) || Casilla (1) || 24,123 || 0–2 || L2
|- bgcolor="#bbffbb"
| 3 || April 6 || Giants || 4–3 || Thornburg (1–0) || López (0–1) || Jeffress (1) || 20,098 || 1–2 || W1
|- bgcolor="#bbffbb"
| 4 || April 8 || Astros || 6–4 || Anderson (1–0) || Feldman (0–1) || Jeffress (2) || 30,100 || 2–2 || W2
|- bgcolor="#ffbbbb"
| 5 || April 9 || Astros || 4–6 || Fister (1–0) || Peralta (0–2) || Gregerson (2) || 28,127 || 2–3 || L1
|- bgcolor="#bbffbb"
| 6 || April 10 || Astros || 3–2 || Nelson (1–1) || Keuchel (1–1) || Jeffress (3) || 28,441 || 3–3 || W1
|- bgcolor="#ffbbbb"
| 7 || April 11 || @ Cardinals || 1–10 || Wacha (1–0) || Jungmann (0–1) || — || 47,608 || 3–4 || L1
|- bgcolor="#bbffbb"
| 8 || April 13 || @ Cardinals || 6–4 || Blazek (1–0) || Rosenthal (0–1) || Jeffress (4) || 40,994 || 4–4 || W1
|- bgcolor="#ffbbbb"
| 9 || April 14 || @ Cardinals || 0–7 || García (1–0) || Peralta (0–3) || — || 40,168 || 4–5 || L1
|- bgcolor="#bbffbb"
| 10 || April 15 || @ Pirates || 8–4 || Nelson (2–1) || Locke (0–1) || — || 24,280 || 5–5  || W1
|- bgcolor="#ffbbbb"
| 11 || April 16 || @ Pirates || 0–5 || Niese (2–0) || Jungmann (0–2) || — || 34,957 || 5–6 || L1
|- bgcolor="#ffbbbb"
| 12 || April 17 || @ Pirates || 3–9 || Nicasio (2–1) || Davies (0–1) || — || 31,124 || 5–7 || L2
|- bgcolor="#ffbbbb"
| 13 || April 18 || @ Twins || 4–7 (6) || Hughes (1–2) || Anderson (1–1) || — || 21,078 || 5–8 || L3
|- bgcolor="#bbffbb"
| 14 || April 19 || @ Twins || 6–5 || Thornburg (2–0) || Jepsen (0–3) || Jeffress (5) || 17,597 || 6–8 || W1
|- bgcolor="#bbffbb"
| 15 || April 20 || Twins || 10–5 || Nelson (3–1) || Pressly (1–1) || — || 21,087 || 7–8 || W2
|- bgcolor="#ffbbbb"
| 16 || April 21 || Twins || 1–8 || Nolasco (1–0) || Jungmann (0–3) || — || 30,107 || 7–9 || L1
|- bgcolor="#ffbbbb"
| 17 || April 22 || Phillies || 2–5 || Nola (1–2) || Davies (0–2) || — || 23,439 || 7–10 || L2
|- bgcolor="#ffbbbb"
| 18 || April 23 || Phillies || 6–10 || Oberholtzer (1–0) || Anderson (1–2) || — || 34,813 || 7–11 || L3
|- bgcolor="#bbffbb"
| 19 || April 24 || Phillies || 8–5 || Peralta (1–3) || Eickhoff (1–3) || Jeffress (6) || 28,131 || 8–11 || W1
|- bgcolor="#ffbbbb"
| 20 || April 26 || @ Cubs || 3–4 || Warren (2–0) || Nelson (3–2) || Rondón (4) || 35,861 || 8–12 || L1
|- bgcolor="#bbbbbb"
| — || April 27 || @ Cubs ||
|colspan="7" | Postponed (inclement weather) (Makeup date: August 16)
|- bgcolor="#ffbbbb"
| 21 || April 28 || @ Cubs || 2–7 || Arrieta (5–0) || Jungmann (0–4) || — || 32,734 || 8–13 || L2
|- bgcolor="#ffbbbb"
| 22 || April 29 || Marlins || 3–6 || Conley (1–1) || Davies (0–3) || Ramos (7) || 23,215 || 8–14 || L3
|- bgcolor="#ffbbbb"
| 23 || April 30 || Marlins || 5–7 || Chen (2–1) || Anderson (1–3) || Phelps (1) || 28,193 || 8–15 || L4

! width="5%"  | Streak
|- bgcolor="#bbffbb"
| 24 || May 1 || Marlins || 14–5 || Peralta (2–3) || Koehler (2–3) || — || 28,181 || 9–15 || W1
|- bgcolor="#bbffbb"
| 25 || May 2 || Angels || 8–5 || Nelson (4–2) || Weaver (3–1) || — || 21,352 || 10–15 || W2
|- bgcolor="#bbffbb"
| 26 || May 3 || Angels || 5–4 || Guerra (1–0) || Tropeano (1–1) || Jeffress (7) || 28,180 || 11–15 || W3
|- bgcolor="#ffbbbb"
| 27 || May 4 || Angels || 3–7 || Salas (2–1) || Thornburg (2–1) || Smith (2) || 21,907 || 11–16 || L1
|- bgcolor="#ffbbbb"
| 28 || May 5 || @ Reds || 5–9 || Simón (1–3) || Anderson (1–4) || — || 13,088 || 11–17 || L2
|- bgcolor="#ffbbbb"
| 29 || May 6 || @ Reds || 1–5 || Adleman (1–0) || Cravy (0–1) || Cingrani (1) || 28,249 || 11–18 || L3
|- bgcolor="#bbffbb"
| 30 || May 7 || @ Reds || 13–7 (10) || Jeffress (1–0) || Cotham (0–2) || — || 27,567 || 12–18 || W1
|- bgcolor="#bbffbb"
| 31 || May 8 || @ Reds || 5–4 || Capuano (1–0) || Ohlendorf (3–3) || Jeffress (8) || 22,376 || 13–18 || W2
|- bgcolor="#ffbbbb"
| 32 || May 9 || @ Marlins || 1–4 || Fernández (4–2) || Peralta (2–4) || Morris (1) || 16,769 || 13–19 || L1
|- bgcolor="#bbffbb"
| 33 || May 10 || @ Marlins || 10–2 || Davies (1–3) || Conley (2–2) || — || 17,225 || 14–19 || W1
|- bgcolor="#ffbbbb"
| 34 || May 11 || @ Marlins || 2–3 || Chen (3–1) ||  Anderson (1–5) || Ramos (10) || 19,893 || 14–20 || L1
|- bgcolor="#ffbbbb"
| 35 || May 12 || Padres || 0–3 || Shields (2–5) || Nelson (4–3) || Buchter (1) || 17,374 || 14–21 || L2
|- bgcolor="#bbffbb"
| 36 || May 13 || Padres || 1–0 || Guerra (2–0) || Friedrich (0–1) || Jeffress (9) || 35,291 || 15–21 || W1
|- bgcolor="#ffbbbb"
| 37 || May 14 || Padres || 7–8 (12) || Campos (1–0) || Capuano (1–1) || Villanueva (1) || 28,896 || 15–22 || L1
|- bgcolor="#bbffbb"
| 38 || May 15 || Padres || 3–2 || Boyer (1–0) || Quackenbush (1–2) || Jeffress (10) || 26,306 || 16–22 || W1
|- bgcolor="#bbffbb"
| 39 || May 17 || Cubs || 4–2 || Anderson (2–5) || Hendricks (2–3) || Jeffress (11) || 24,361 || 17–22 || W2
|- bgcolor="#ffbbbb"
| 40 || May 18 || Cubs || 1–2 (13) || Wood (2–0) || Torres (0–1) || Richard (1) || 31,212 || 17–23 || L1
|- bgcolor="#bbffbb"
| 41 || May 19 || Cubs || 5–3 || Guerra (3–0) || Hammel (5–1) || Thornburg (1) || 38,781 || 18–23 || W1
|- bgcolor="#ffbbbb"
| 42 || May 20 || @ Mets || 2–3 || Matz (6–1) || Peralta (2–5) || Familia (14) || 36,239 || 18–24 || L1
|- bgcolor="#ffbbbb"
| 43 || May 21 || @ Mets || 4–5 || Familia (1–0) || Blazek (1–1) || — || 39,688 || 18–25 || L2
|- bgcolor="#ffbbbb"
| 44 || May 22 || @ Mets || 1–3 || Syndergaard (5–2) || Anderson (2–6) || Familia (15) || 40,173 || 18–26 || L3
|- bgcolor="#bbffbb"
| 45 || May 24 || @ Braves || 2–1 || Blazek (2–1) || Norris (1–6) || Jeffress (12) || 15,185 || 19–26 || W1
|- bgcolor="#bbffbb"
| 46 || May 25 || @ Braves || 3–2 (13) || Blazek (3–1) || Kelly (0–2) || Torres (1) || 12,869 || 20–26 || W2
|- bgcolor="#bbffbb"
| 47 || May 26 || @ Braves || 6–2 || Peralta (3–5) || Wisler (2–4) || Torres (2) || 14,885 || 21–26 || W3
|- bgcolor="#bbffbb"
| 48 || May 27 || Reds || 9–5 || Davies (2–3) || Lamb (0–3) || — || 20,441 || 22–26 || W4
|- bgcolor="#ffbbbb"
| 49 || May 28 || Reds || 6–7 || Wood (4–1) || Jeffress (1–1) || Cingrani (4) || 30,293 || 22–27 || L1
|- bgcolor="#bbffbb"
| 50 || May 29 || Reds || 5–4 || Nelson (5–3) || Finnegan (1–4) || Boyer (1) || 34,901 || 23–27 || W1
|- bgcolor="#ffbbbb"
| 51 || May 30 || Cardinals || 0–6 || Martínez (5–5) || Guerra (3–1) || — || 34,569 || 23–28 || L1
|- bgcolor="#ffbbbb"
| 52 || May 31 || Cardinals || 3–10 || Leake (4–4) || Peralta (3–6) || — || 24,487 || 23–29 || L2

! width="5%"  | Streak
|- bgcolor="#bbffbb"
| 53 || June 1 || Cardinals || 3–1 || Davies (3–3) || García (4–5) || Jeffress (13) || 24,050 || 24–29 || W1
|- bgcolor="#bbffbb"
| 54 || June 2 || @ Phillies || 4–1 || Anderson (3–6) || Eickhoff (2–8) || Jeffress (14) || 22,890 || 25–29 || W2
|- bgcolor="#ffbbbb"
| 55 || June 3 || @ Phillies || 3–6 || Bailey (3–0) || Nelson (5–4) || Gómez (18) || 20,138 || 25–30 || L1
|- bgcolor="#bbffbb"
| 56 || June 4 || @ Phillies || 6–3 || Smith (1–0) || Neris (1–3) || Jeffress (15) || 25,177 || 26–30 || W1
|- bgcolor="#ffbbbb"
| 57 || June 5 || @ Phillies || 1–8 || Nola (5–4) || Peralta (3–7) || — || 24,259 || 26–31 || L1
|- bgcolor="#bbffbb"
| 58 || June 7 || Athletics || 5–4 || Davies (4–3) || Manaea (2–4) || Jeffress (16) || 19,283 || 27–31 || W1
|- bgcolor="#bbffbb"
| 59 || June 8 || Athletics || 4–0 || Anderson (4–6) || Hahn (2–4) || — || 18,188 || 28–31 || W2
|- bgcolor="#ffbbbb"
| 60 || June 9 || Mets || 2–5 || Colón (5–3) || Nelson (5–5) || Familia (20) || 22,980 || 28–32 || L1
|- bgcolor="#ffbbbb"
| 61 || June 10 || Mets || 1–2 (11) || Blevins (2–0) || Boyer (1–1) || Familia (21) || 27,358 || 28–33 || L2
|- bgcolor="#bbffbb"
| 62 || June 11 || Mets || 7–4 || Peralta (4–7) || Verrett (3–4) || Jeffress (17) || 38,423 || 29–33 || W1
|- bgcolor="#bbffbb"
| 63 || June 12 || Mets || 5–3 || Davies (5–3) || Matz (7–3) || Jeffress (18) || 32,491 || 30–33 || W2
|- bgcolor="#ffbbbb"
| 64 || June 13 || @ Giants || 5–11 || Suárez (2–1) || Knebel (0–1) || Law (1) || 41,543 || 30–34 || L1
|- bgcolor="#ffbbbb"
| 65 || June 14 || @ Giants || 2–3 || Bumgarner (8–2) || Smith (1–1) || Casilla (14) || 41,750 || 30–35 || L2
|- bgcolor="#ffbbbb"
| 66 || June 15 || @ Giants || 1–10 || Cueto (10–1) || Nelson (5–6) || — || 41,811 || 30–36 || L3
|- bgcolor="#bbffbb"
| 67 || June 16 || @ Dodgers || 8–6 || Thornburg (3–1) || Báez (0–2) || Jeffress (19) || 44,183 || 31–36 || W1
|- bgcolor="#ffbbbb"
| 68 || June 17 || @ Dodgers || 2–3 (10) || Báez (1–2) || Jeffress (1–2) || — || 44,998 || 31–37 || L1
|- bgcolor="#ffbbbb"
| 69 || June 18 || @ Dodgers || 6–10 || Hatcher (4–3) || Anderson (4–7) || — || 44,112 || 31–38 || L2
|- bgcolor="#ffbbbb"
| 70 || June 19 || @ Dodgers || 1–2 || Jansen (3–2) || Thornburg (3–2) || — || 45,931 || 31–39 || L3
|- bgcolor="#ffbbbb"
| 71 || June 21 || @ Athletics || 3–5 || Doolittle (2–2) || Smith (1–2) || Madson (13) || 14,810 || 31–40 || L4
|- bgcolor="#bbffbb"
| 72 || June 22 || @ Athletics || 4–2 || Guerra (4–1) || Mengden (0–3) || Thornburg (2) || 13,586 || 32–40 || W1
|- bgcolor="#bbffbb"
| 73 || June 24 || Nationals || 5–3 || Torres (1–1) || Scherzer (8–5) || Jeffress (20) || 32,668 || 33–40 || W2
|- bgcolor="#bbffbb"
| 74 || June 25 || Nationals || 6–5 || Garza (1–0) || González (3–7) || Jeffress (21) || 30,085 || 34–40 || W3
|- bgcolor="#ffbbbb"
| 75 || June 26 || Nationals || 2–3 || Roark (7–5) || Barnes (0–1) || Kelley (3) || 30,215 || 34–41 || L1
|- bgcolor="#ffbbbb"
| 76 || June 28 || Dodgers || 5–6 || Urías (1–2) || Anderson (4–8)  || Jansen (23) ||  33,819 || 34–42 || L2
|- bgcolor="#bbffbb"
| 77 || June 29 || Dodgers || 7–0 || Guerra (5–1) || Stewart (0–1) || — || 26,566 || 35–42 || W1
|- bgcolor="#ffbbbb"
| 78 || June 30 || Dodgers || 1–8 || Maeda (7–5) || Davies (5–4) || — || 33,029 || 35–43 || L1

! width="5%"  | Streak
|- bgcolor="#ffbbbb"
| 79 || July 1 || @ Cardinals || 1–7 || García (6–6) || Garza (1–1) || — || 42,987 || 35–44 || L2
|- bgcolor="#ffbbbb"
| 80 || July 2 || @ Cardinals || 0–3 || Wainwright (7–5) || Nelson (5–7) || Oh (1) || 40,573 || 35–45 || L3
|- bgcolor="#ffbbbb"
| 81 || July 3 || @ Cardinals || 8–9 || Wacha (5–7) || Anderson (4–9) || Oh (2) || 41,148 || 35–46 || L4
|- bgcolor="#bbffbb"
| 82 || July 4 || @ Nationals || 1–0 || Guerra (6–1) || Scherzer (9–6) || Jeffress (22) || 29,174 || 36–46 || W1
|- bgcolor="#bbffbb"
| 83 || July 5 || @ Nationals || 5–2 || Davies (6–4) || González (4–8) || Jeffress (23) || 25,138 || 37–46 || W2
|- bgcolor="#ffbbbb"
| 84 || July 6 || @ Nationals || 4–7 || Roark (8–5) || Garza (1–2) || Papelbon (17) || 26,330 || 37–47 || L1
|- bgcolor="#bbffbb"
| 85 || July 8 || Cardinals || 4–3 || Jeffress (2–2) || Rosenthal (2–4) || — || 28,343 || 38–47 || W1
|- bgcolor="#ffbbbb"
| 86 || July 9 || Cardinals || 1–8 || Martínez (8–6) || Anderson (4–10) || — || 37,101 || 38–48 || L1
|- bgcolor="#ffbbbb"
| 87 || July 10 || Cardinals || 1–5 || Leake (6–7) || Guerra (6–2) || — || 42,066 || 38–49 || L2
|- style="text-align:center; background:#bbcaff;"
| colspan="10" | 87th All-Star Game in San Diego, California
|- bgcolor="#ffbbbb"
| 88 || July 15 || @ Reds || 4–5 || DeSclafani (4–0) || Garza (1–3) || Ohlendorf (2) || 30,680 || 38–50 || L3
|- bgcolor="#bbffbb"
| 89 || July 16 || @ Reds || 9–1 || Nelson (6–7) || Lamb (1–7) || — || 31,328 || 39–50 || W1
|- bgcolor="#ffbbbb"
| 90 || July 17 || @ Reds || 0–1 || Cingrani (2–2) || Thornburg (3–3) || — || 23,085 || 39–51 || L1
|- bgcolor="#ffbbbb"
| 91 || July 19 || @ Pirates || 2–3 || Melancon (1–1) || Thornburg (3–4) || — || 27,106 || 39–52 || L2
|- bgcolor="#bbffbb"
| 92 || July 20 || @ Pirates || 9–5 || Torres (2–1) || Locke (8–6) || — || 36,717 || 40–52 || W1
|- bgcolor="#ffbbbb"
| 93 || July 21 || @ Pirates || 3–5 || Liriano (6–9) || Garza (1–4) || Melancon (28) || 35,978 || 40–53 || L1
|- bgcolor="#ffbbbb"
| 94 || July 22 || Cubs || 2–5 || Hammel (9–5) || Nelson (6–8) || Rondón (17) || 42,243 || 40–54 || L2
|- bgcolor="#bbffbb"
| 95 || July 23 || Cubs || 6–1 || Davies (7–4) || Lackey (7–7) || — || 44,643 || 41–54 || W1
|- bgcolor="#ffbbbb"
| 96 || July 24 || Cubs || 5–6 || Nathan (1–0) || Smith (1–3) || Rondón (18) || 43,310 || 41–55 || L1
|- bgcolor="#bbffbb"
| 97 || July 25 || D-backs || 7–2 || Anderson (5–10) || Shipley (0–1) || — || 25,347 || 42–55 || W1
|- bgcolor="#bbffbb"
| 98 || July 26 || D-backs || 9–4 || Thornburg (4–4) || Hudson (1–2) || — || 24,074 || 43–55 || W2
|- bgcolor="#ffbbbb"
| 99 || July 27 || D-backs || 1–8 || Bradley (4–6) || Nelson (6–9) || — || 22,581 || 43–56 || L1
|- bgcolor="#bbffbb"
| 100 || July 28 || D-backs || 6–4 || Davies (8–4) || Ray (5–10) || Jeffress (24) || 33,971 || 44–56 || W1
|- bgcolor="#bbffbb"
| 101 || July 29 || Pirates || 3–1 || Guerra (7–2) || Brault (0–1) || Jeffress (25) || 29,442 || 45–56 || W2
|- bgcolor="#bbffbb"
| 102 || July 30 || Pirates || 5–3 || Anderson (6–10) || Taillon (2–2) || Jeffress (26) || 36,663 || 46–56 || W3
|- bgcolor="#bbffbb"
| 103 || July 31 || Pirates || 4–2 || Garza (2–4) || Liriano (6–11) || Jeffress (27) || 32,405 || 47–56 || W4

! width="5%"  | Streak
|- bgcolor="#ffbbbb"
| 104 || August 1 || @ Padres || 3–7 || Villanueva (2–2) || Nelson (6–10) || — || 24,009 || 47–57 || L1
|- bgcolor="#bbffbb"
| 105 || August 2 || @ Padres || 3–2 || Davies (9–4) || Perdomo (5–5) || Thornburg (3) || 26,152 || 48–57 || W1
|- bgcolor="#ffbbbb"
| 106 || August 3 || @ Padres || 3–12 || Jackson (2–2) || Guerra (7–3) || — || 24,124 || 48–58 || L1
|- bgcolor="#ffbbbb"
| 107 || August 5 || @ D-backs || 2–3 (11) || Loewen (1–0) || Boyer (1–2) || — || 20,008 || 48–59 || L2
|- bgcolor="#bbffbb"
| 108 || August 6 || @ D-backs || 15–6 || Garza (3–4) || Corbin (4–11) || — || 29,370 || 49–59 || W1 
|- bgcolor="#ffbbbb"
| 109 || August 7 || @ D-backs || 3–9 || Hudson (2–2) || Nelson (6–11) || — || 24,021 || 49–60 || L1
|- bgcolor="#ffbbbb"
| 110 || August 8 || Braves || 3–4 (12) || Cunniff (1–0) || Torres (2–2) || Johnson (9) || 20,976 || 49–61 || L2 
|- bgcolor="#ffbbbb"
| 111 || August 9 || Braves || 1–2 || Jenkins (2–2) || Peralta (4–8) || Cabrera (3) || 20,048 || 49–62 || L3
|- bgcolor="#bbffbb"
| 112 || August 10 || Braves || 4–3 || Anderson (7–10) || De La Cruz (0–5) || Thornburg (4) || 20,035 || 50–62 || W1 
|- bgcolor="#bbffbb"
| 113 || August 11 || Braves || 11–3 || Garza (4–4) || Hernández (1–1) || — || 30,167 || 51–62 || W2 
|- bgcolor="#ffbbbb"
| 114 || August 12 || Reds || 4–7 || Bailey (2–1) || Nelson (6–12) || — || 24,553 || 51–63 || L1 
|- bgcolor="#ffbbbb"
| 115 || August 13 || Reds || 5–11 || Straily (8–6) || Davies (9–5) || — || 30,357 || 51–64 || L2
|- bgcolor="#bbffbb"
| 116 || August 14 || Reds || 7–3 || Peralta (5–8) || Reed (0–7) || — || 30,103 || 52–64 || W1
|- bgcolor="#ffbbbb"
| 117 || August 16 || @ Cubs || 0–4 || Cahill (2–3) || Garza (4–5) || Chapman (25) || 41,148 || 52–65 || L1
|- bgcolor="#ffbbbb"
| 118 || August 16 || @ Cubs || 1–4 || Hammel (13–5) || Mariñez (0–1) || Chapman (26) || 39,420 || 52–66 || L2
|- bgcolor="#ffbbbb"
| 119 || August 17 || @ Cubs || 1–6 || Lester (13–4) || Nelson (6–13) || — || 40,310 || 52–67 || L3
|- bgcolor="#ffbbbb"
| 120 || August 18 || @ Cubs || 6–9 || Arrieta (15–5) || Davies (9–6) || Chapman (27) || 41,407 || 52–68 || L4 
|- bgcolor="#ffbbbb"
| 121 || August 19 || @ Mariners || 6–7 || LeBlanc (3–0) || Suter (0–1) || Díaz (9) || 37,758 || 52–69 || L5 
|- bgcolor="#ffbbbb"
| 122 || August 20 || @ Mariners || 2–8 || Hernández (8–4) || Peralta (5–9) || — || 29,170 || 52–70 || L6
|- bgcolor="#bbffbb"
| 123 || August 21 || @ Mariners || 7–6 || Thornburg (5–4) || Wilhelmsen (2–4) || — || 35,833 || 53–70 || W1
|- bgcolor="#bbffbb"
| 124 || August 22 || Rockies || 4–2 || Nelson (7–13) || Bettis (10–7) || Thornburg (5) || 20,458 || 54–70 || W2 
|- bgcolor="#bbffbb"
| 125 || August 23 || Rockies || 6–4 || Suter (1–1) || Logan (2–3) || Knebel (1) || 21,460 || 55–70 || W3
|- bgcolor="#bbffbb"
| 126 || August 24 || Rockies || 7–1 || Davies (10–6) || Anderson (4–5) || — || 26,702 || 56–70 || W4 
|- bgcolor="#ffbbbb"
| 127 || August 25 || Pirates || 2–3 (10) || Bastardo (2–0) || Torres (2–3) || Watson (8) || 20,296 || 56–71 || L1 
|- bgcolor="#ffbbbb"
| 128 || August 26 || Pirates || 3–5 || Vogelsong (3–3) || Garza (4–6) || Watson (9) || 25,474 || 56–72 || L2 
|- bgcolor="#ffbbbb"
| 129 || August 27 || Pirates || 6–9 || Locke (9–7) || Boyer (1–3) || Feliz (2) || 35,295 || 56–73 || L3 
|- bgcolor="#ffbbbb"
| 130 || August 28 || Pirates || 1–3 || Nova (11–6) || Anderson (7–11) || Watson (10) || 37,583 || 56–74 || L4 
|- bgcolor="#ffbbbb"
| 131 || August 29 || Cardinals || 5–6 || Socolovich (1–0) || Thornburg (5–5) || Oh (14) || 18,663 || 56–75 || L5 
|- bgcolor="#ffbbbb"
| 132 || August 30 || Cardinals || 1–2 (10) || Oh (4–2) || Knebel (0–2) || Duke (2) || 22,918 || 56–76 || L6 
|- bgcolor="#bbffbb"
| 133 || August 31 || Cardinals || 3–1 || Garza (5–6) || Weaver (1–2) || Thornburg (6) || 17,645 || 57–76 || W1 

! width="5%"  | Streak
|- bgcolor="#bbffbb"
| 134 || September 2 || @ Pirates || 1–0 || Boyer (2–3) || Taillon (3–4) || Thornburg (7) || 21,772 || 58–76 || W2
|- bgcolor="#bbffbb"
| 135 || September 3 || @ Pirates || 7–4 || Torres (3–3) || Feliz (4–2) || Thornburg (8) || 26,637 || 59–76 || W3 
|- bgcolor="#bbffbb"
| 136 || September 4 || @ Pirates || 10–0 || Anderson (8–11) || Brault (0–2) || — || 25,318 || 60–76 || W4
|- bgcolor="#ffbbbb"
| 137 || September 5 || Cubs || 2–7 || Hendricks (14–7) || Davies (10–7) || — || 43,662 || 60–77 || L1
|- bgcolor="#bbffbb"
| 138 || September 6 || Cubs || 12–5 || Peralta (6–9) || Hammel (14–8) || — || 32,888 || 61–77 || W1
|- bgcolor="#bbffbb"
| 139 || September 7 || Cubs || 2–1 || Knebel (1–2) || Smith (2–5) || Thornburg (9) || 23,832 || 62–77 || W2 
|- bgcolor="#bbffbb"
| 140 || September 8 || @ Cardinals || 12–5 || Guerra (8–3) || García (10–12) || — || 40,416 || 63–77 || W3 
|- bgcolor="#ffbbbb"
| 141 || September 9 || @ Cardinals || 3–4 || Martínez (14–7) || Nelson (7–14) || Oh (17) || 42,647 || 63–78 || L1
|- bgcolor="#ffbbbb"
| 142 || September 10 || @ Cardinals || 1–5 || Wainwright (11–8) || Knebel (1–3) || — || 45,440 || 63–79 || L2 
|- bgcolor="#bbffbb"
| 143 || September 11 || @ Cardinals || 2–1 || Thornburg (6–5) || Siegrist (5–3) || — || 44,703 || 64–79 || W1
|- bgcolor="#ffbbbb"
| 144 || September 12 || @ Reds || 0–3 || Wood (6–3) || Peralta (6–10) || Iglesias (3) || 14,671 || 64–80 || L1
|- bgcolor="#ffbbbb"
| 145 || September 13 || @ Reds || 4–6 || Straily (12–8) || Garza (5–7) || — || 12,926 || 64–81 || L2
|- bgcolor="#bbffbb"
| 146 || September 14 || @ Reds || 7–0 || Guerra (9–3) || Adleman (2–4) || — || 14,368 || 65–81 || W1
|- bgcolor="#bbffbb"
| 147 || September 15 || @ Cubs || 5–4 || Nelson (8–14) || Grimm (1–1) || Thornburg (10) || 41,362 || 66–81 || W2 
|- bgcolor="#ffbbbb"
| 148 || September 16 || @ Cubs || 4–5 (10) || Chapman (4–1) || Boyer (2–4) || — || 40,823 || 66–82 || L1
|- bgcolor="#bbffbb"
| 149 || September 17 || @ Cubs || 11–3 || Davies (11–7) || Arrieta (17–7) || — || 40,956 || 67–82 || W1
|- bgcolor="#bbffbb"
| 150 || September 18 || @ Cubs || 3–1 || Peralta (7–10) || Hendricks (15–8) || Thornburg (11) || 41,286 || 68–82 || W2 
|- bgcolor="#ffbbbb"
| 151 || September 20 || Pirates || 3–6 || Hughes (1–1) || Garza (5–8) || Watson (14) || 20,829 || 68–83 || L1 
|- bgcolor="#ffbbbb"
| 152 || September 21 || Pirates || 1–4 || Kuhl (5–3) || Nelson (8–15) || Watson (15) || 25,482 || 68–84 || L2
|- bgcolor="#bbffbb"
| 153 || September 22 || Pirates || 3–1 || Anderson (9–11) || Vogelsong (3–6) || Thornburg (12) || 24,582 || 69–84 || W1
|- bgcolor="#bbffbb"
| 154 || September 23 || Reds || 5–4 || Suter (2–1) || DeSclafani (8–5) || Thornburg (13) || 35,364 || 70–84 || W2 
|- bgcolor="#ffbbbb"
| 155 || September 24 || Reds || 1–6 || Straily (14–8) || Jungmann (0–5) || — || 31,398 || 70–85 || L1
|- bgcolor="#ffbbbb"
| 156 || September 25 || Reds || 2–4 || Finnegan (10–11) || Peralta (7–11) || Iglesias (4) || 31,776 || 70–86 || L2
|- bgcolor="#bbffbb"
| 157 || September 26 || @ Rangers || 8–3 || Garza (6–8) || Pérez (10–11) || — || 27,263 || 71–86 || W1 
|- bgcolor="#ffbbbb"
| 158 || September 27 || @ Rangers || 4–6 || Barnette (7–3) || Nelson (8–16) || Dyson (37) || 29,668 || 71–87 || L1 
|- bgcolor="#ffbbbb"
| 159 || September 28 || @ Rangers || 5–8 || Jeffress (3–2) || Knebel (1–4) || — || 36,619 || 71–88 || L2 
|- bgcolor="#ffbbbb" 
| 160 || September 30 || @ Rockies || 1–4 || Bettis (14–8) || Suter (2–2) || Ottavino (7) || 41,068 || 71–89 || L3 

! width="5%"  | Streak
|- bgcolor="#bbffbb"
| 161 || October 1 || @ Rockies || 4–3 (10) || Thornburg (7–5) || Ottavino (1–3) || Barnes (1) || 32,835 || 72–89 || W1 
|- bgcolor="#bbffbb"
| 162 || October 2 || @ Rockies || 6–4 (10) || Thornburg (8–5) || Rusin (3–5) || Knebel' (2) || 27,762 || 73–89 || W2 

| 

Detailed Records

Roster

Farm system

The Brewers' farm system consisted of seven minor league affiliates in 2016.

References

External links

2016 Milwaukee Brewers season at Baseball Reference''
Milwaukee Brewers season Official Site 

Milwaukee Brewers seasons
Milwaukee Brewers
Milwaukee Brewers